Harriet Blank (born 26 October 1944) is a German former swimmer. She competed in the women's 400 metre individual medley at the 1964 Summer Olympics.

References

1944 births
Living people
German female swimmers
Olympic swimmers of the United Team of Germany
Swimmers at the 1964 Summer Olympics
Swimmers from Leipzig
German female medley swimmers